Brat Pack is a comic book limited series by Rick Veitch (self-published under the company name King Hell Press). It is a dark satire on superhero sidekicks, influenced partly by the publicity stunt in which readers voted to kill off Batman's sidekick Jason Todd, but also built on other long-standing rumors and undercurrents in the history of the superhero genre, prominently commercialism, violence, and the fascist tendencies inherent in heroes.

Publication history 
Brat Pack was released as a limited series in 1990–1991.

Plot 

The series opens with the villainous Dr. Blasphemy calling in to a radio show where the local residents of Slumburg, Pennsylvania (the setting of the story) are venting about their dislike for a teenage superhero sidekick. Chippy (the pink leather-clad sidekick of the gay superhero Midnight Mink) is widely reviled, which leads to Dr. Blasphemy challenging the host of the radio program to hold a call-in radio poll: if a majority votes for Chippy and his fellow superhero sidekicks to die, then Dr. Blasphemy will carry out the will of the people and murder them. Most of the general public call in to vote for the murder of the sidekicks, unaware of the result of their action.

While Blasphemy is holding court on the radio waves, Chippy is meeting with a local priest with whom he talks about the cruelty of the adult heroes that he and his friends work for. Leaving the confessional chamber, a young altar boy named Cody notices the teen hero leave and realizes that his priest knows the heroes.

That evening, Chippy meets up with his fellow sidekicks (Kid Vicious, Luna, and Wild Boy), all of whom take turns bullying the young hero. Their torment of Chippy is interrupted by the arrival of Dr. Blasphemy; as he taunts the heroes, there is a sudden explosion, killing three of the heroes and horribly disfiguring Chippy (who is protected by an accelerated healing power given to him by Midnight Mink). Horribly maimed, Chippy opts to go into hiding.

Midnight Mink; the racist Judge Jury; the misandrist Moon Mistress; and the drug addict King Rad meet to discuss the deaths of their sidekicks. The four heroes (known collectively as Black October) have licensed their images to various corporations for profit; however, their contracts state that they must have teen sidekicks. They confront Father Dunn, ordering him to procure four youths from the local community for the four to take on as the new Chippy, Luna, Kid Vicious, and Wild Boy. After they leave, Cody (having heard everything) appears and offers himself as the new Chippy.

The series then focuses on the new Luna, Wild Boy, and Kid Vicious, as well as Cody's transition into becoming a superhero.

Luna II is a spoiled, yet sweet teenage girl named Shannon who dumps her boyfriend to be Luna and dotes on her single father. Moon Maiden murders her father and arranges to adopt her.

Kid Vicious II is a lonely rich kid named Beau raised by a mostly absent widow. Beau spends his time alone. When encharged with the task to be Kid Vicious, he stocks up on books about Nazism and racism to appease Judge Jury. Judge Jury murders Beau's mother and frames her boyfriend for the crime, then tortures Kid Vicious (to break him mentally) while pumping him full of steroids and other drugs that cause him to become violent and aggressive.

Wild Boy II is a Hispanic skateboarder named Karlo, whose parents run a successful local grocery store. King Rad doesn't murder Karlo's parents directly, but he allows a fire caused by arsonists to go unchecked, killing Wild Boy II's parents and siblings. Karlo is then made to indulge in harsh drugs against his will, but ultimately starts using them willingly after a search and rescue mission goes wrong with Karlo unable to save a young boy from being torn in two.
 
Cody Batson is raised by two drug-addicted parents; he has earned awards from the police for reporting their crimes. He begged Father Dunn to have the role as the new Chippy talking about his dedication to Midnight Mink.

As the series progress, the four heroes systematically break their young charges mentally and physically through extensive physical abuse (Judge Jury); drug addiction (King Rad); and psychological manipulation (Midnight Mink and Moon Mistress). While they do so, they discuss the missing fifth member of the group: True-Man.

A being of pure energy, True-Man personally trained Moon Maiden as a hero; was best friends and lovers with Midnight Mink; and who brought the wildcards Judge Jury and King Rad into his orbit to stop a war between the two and True-Man and his friends, allowing them to become the sole protectors of Slumburg.

True-Man eventually became jaded with humans and ultimately left the Earth. However, before he left, True-Man discovered that Midnight Mink had contracted AIDS, and he transfused his blood into Midnight Mink. The transfusion granted invulnerability to Midnight Mink of his AIDS, but also granted him (and anyone who is exposed to his blood in transfusion form) superhuman endurance to pain and injury, along with the ability to heal any wounds. Cody, after several battles, proves himself a worthy replacement as Chippy, and Midnight Mink performs a blood transfusion granting Cody the same power.

By the end, all four teen heroes are irrevocably broken mentally, just like their predecessors: Beau is now a steroid addicted bully, Karlo a drug addict, and Shannon has become completely jaded and promiscuous. Meanwhile, Cody finds himself repeatedly visiting Father Dunn. He reveals that all three of his fellow sidekicks hate and despise him, due to the fact that Midnight Mink doesn't overtly abuse and mock Cody like the other heroes do. He further states that he has become disaffected with the life of a hero, along with the sociopathic tendencies of Midnight Mink and the other members of Black October. He is angry and dissatisfied with Dunn, slamming a bottle of whiskey on his face and running out the scene.

Original Ending
The original five issue mini-series had the following ending that is only available in Brat Pack #5.

After leaving Father Dunn's confessional, the opening scene from the first issue plays out again with the other sidekicks attacking Cody. However, there is a loud scream from the church as the heroes storm in and find Dr. Blasphemy waiting for them with a large coffin: he orders the heroes to open it (after flinging the dying remains of the original Chippy at Cody) and reveals it full of contracts and legal documents for merchandise, comics, TV shows, and movies.

Dr. Blasphemy reveals that the kids are pawns of corporate America: they require the psychopathic heroes have teen sidekicks to make them appear wholesome and fatherly/motherly to the masses and then reveals that their partners murdered their parents so they could ensure that they did not have to split the money from the merchandise deals. Chippy inspects one document and discovers a clause in it: when the sidekicks become of legal age (18), the heroes must then start splitting the proceeds from their lucrative merchandise/media deals with their sidekicks. Chippy then realizes that Midnight Mink, Judge Jury, King Rad, and Moon Mistress were responsible for the bomb blast that killed their sidekicks, all of whom were on the verge of turning 18 years old. However, before they can do anything a bomb is dropped on the church by a plane flown by Black October.

Storming the bombed out remains the church, Father Dunn (about to hang himself in the bell tower), finds a bag and a note telling him to open it. Inside, he finds Dr. Blasphemy's hood which he puts on as he hangs himself. The Black October go to the bell tower and find him hanging, but quickly realize that he's doesn't have the full costume of their enemy. Suddenly the electrical storm reaches its peak as True-Man returns at long last. The hero murders his former friends and teammates by trapping them under the church bell which he melts on top of them, as King Rad tries desperately to reach out to his faithful butler (who also served as a servant for Black October) for help. The final shot shows the church in ruins as the radio declares a state of emergency and tells everyone to stay indoors until the lightning storm is over.

Trade Paperback Ending

When the series was released as a trade paperback, Veitch rewrote the ending.

After Midnight Mink's confrontation with Father Dunn, Cody encounters the original Chippy outside the church. Chippy's injuries are too severe for his healing factor to fix; he finally dies but gives Chippy his mask before he passes. Meanwhile, after Midnight Mink's gloating over him, Father Dunn pulls out a gun and shoots Mink. Chippy responds by rescuing the hero and overseeing his recovery, going so far as to perform a blood transfusion so his own healing factor can help speed up Mink's healing process.

Afterwards, the sidekicks are forced to attend a convention where they sign autographs and meet their fans. An angry fan of the original Chippy wounds Cody, revealing Cody's healing factor power to the other teen sidekicks. After they Like the issue, Cody confesses to Dunn about the horrors of Black October, he escapes and goes to the church floor to meet with his teammates. Like their predecessors, they take turns tormenting and brutalizing Chippy to force him to give up the secret of his healing powers. The torture is interrupted when Dr. Blasphemy appears and lures the teens inside. A coffin is then presented to them, claiming to hold death and a secret. While Beau, Shannon, and Karlo all proclaim that they hope it is their mentors, Cody realizes the truth. He declares that the coffin is a bomb and quickly disarms it before opening it up to show the explosives inside. Shannon, Karlo, and Beau realize they know their heroes have access to bomb-making equipment and realize that their mentors want to kill them, just like they killed the previous sidekicks they replaced. Bleeding from the beating, Cody grabs a nearby sacrament cup and fills it with his blood, so they can share in his healing factor. Pointing out how utterly corrupt and evil Black October is, Cody warns that they need to either flee town or prepare for a final showdown with their mentors. At this point, from his plane, Midnight Mink drops a bomb on the church.

The rest of the ending plays out as it did in the original book: Black October go into the church, where they find Father Dunn having hung himself while wearing a Dr. Blasphemy mask. True-Man then appears to kill his former teammates. Due to the blood they consumed, the teen sidekicks have survived the explosion, so they watch with glee as they reveal that True-Man is upset with the utter corruption and evil of his former friends as he executes them for their crimes. However, before the comic ends with the shot of the ruined church and the radio calling for citizens to stay indoors, it's revealed that Dr. Blasphemy was Fredo, the butler for King Rad.

Characters 
The main characters of Brat Pack are:
 Midnight Mink, a homosexual vigilante and his sidekick Chippy
 Judge Jury, a fascist, white supremacist, steroid-using murderous vigilante, and his sidekick Kid Vicious
 Moon Mistress, a man-hating warrior woman, and her sidekick Luna
 King Rad, an armored hero bent on living the ultimate rush, and his sidekick Wild Boy

Reception 
Brat Pack is Rick Veitch/King Hell's top-selling title, with the fourth edition selling out in late 2007. Veitch released a fifth edition in 2009. Comics reporter Heidi MacDonald considers Brat Pack the third part of "the troika of immortal works dissecting the superhero genre, with the other two being Dark Knight and Watchmen. Indeed, for those brave readers looking for a follow-up to Watchmen, Brat Pack could be just the thing."

Awards
1992: Nominated for the "Best Finite Series" Eisner Award

Quotes 
Neil Gaiman, from his introduction to the trade paperback:

Adaptations

Film
Bratpack has been optioned by ARS Nova, the producers of Black Dynamite.

Notes

References

External links 
 Free 7.2 MB PDF download of Brat Pack's first 32 page-chapter

American comics titles
LGBT superheroes
1990 comics debuts